This article is a list of things named after Edward Teller Hungarian-American theoretical physicist, regarded by some as "the father of the hydrogen bomb".

Ashkin–Teller model 
Axilrod–Teller potential 
Brunauer–Emmett–Teller theory
Gamow–Teller transition
Inglis–Teller equation
Jahn–Teller effect
Pseudo Jahn–Teller effect
Lyddane–Sachs–Teller relation
Pöschl–Teller potential 
Renner–Teller effects
Teller–Ulam design

teller